Orlando Rashad Coulter (born November 27, 1981) is an American professional mixed martial artist who most recently competed in the light heavyweight division of the Ultimate Fighting Championship. A professional since 2011, he has also competed for Bellator MMA and Legacy Fighting Championship.

Background
Coulter was born in North Carolina but eventually moved to Texas with his single parent father. Prior to beginning MMA, Coulter played American football for 17 years. He graduated from Plano East Senior High School and continued to Texas A&M University–Commerce from where he dropped out after complete quadriceps tear shattered his NFL dream. He was introduced to mixed martial arts by his childhood friend Muhammed Lawal and began training in Muay Thai in early 2010. Lawal also gave Coulter the nickname "The Daywalker."

Mixed martial arts career

Early career
Coulter made his professional MMA debut in June 2011. Over the next five-and-a-half years, he amassed a record of 8 wins against 1 loss with all of his wins coming via knockout.

Ultimate Fighting Championship
For his UFC debut, Coulter stepped in to replace Dmitry Poberezhets on short notice against Chase Sherman at UFC 211 on May 13, 2017. Coulter lost the fight by knockout in the second round. However, the back-and-forth action earned both participants Fight of the Night honors.

For his second fight in the promotion, Coulter faced debuting Tai Tuivasa on November 19, 2017 at UFC Fight Night: Werdum vs. Tybura. He lost the fight via knockout due to a flying knee in the first round.

In his third fight for the promotion, Coulter was scheduled to face Allen Crowder on June 19, 2018 at UFC 225. However, on May 12, it was announced that Chris de la Rocha has replaced Crowder for undisclosed reasons. Coulter lost the fight via TKO in the second round.

In his fourth fight for the promotion, Coulter moved to Light heavyweight to face Hu Yaozong on November 24, 2018 at UFC Fight Night: Blaydes vs. Ngannou 2. At the weigh-ins, Coulter weighed in at 208 pounds, 2 pounds over the light heavyweight non-title fight limit of 206. He was fined 20 percent of his purse, which went to his opponent. Coulter won the fight by unanimous decision, marking his first decision win in his career and UFC win in his year with the company.

Post-UFC career
After departing with the UFC, Coulter challenged Ike Villanueva for the Fury FC Light Heavyweight Championship at Fury FC 40 on December 13, 2019. After being knocked down early in the fight, he was eventually finished by technical knockout later in the round.

Coulter was scheduled to face Ty Flores at Fury FC 48 on July 25, 2021. This was later changed to Fury FC 51 on September 12, 2021 and was subsequently cancelled.

Coulter was then scheduled to face Christian Larsen for the Unified MMA Heavyweight Championship at Unified MMA 45 on May 27, 2022. However, Coulter withdrew from the fight and was replaced by Grayson Wells.

Personal life
Coulter is a single father to two sons.

Championships and accomplishments

Mixed martial arts
Ultimate Fighting Championship
 Fight of the Night (One time) vs. Chase Sherman

Mixed martial arts record

|-
|Loss
|align=center|9–5
|Ike Villanueva
|TKO (punches)
|Fury FC 40
|
|align=center|1
|align=center|3:17
|Humble, Texas, United States
|
|-
|Win
|align=center|9–4
|Hu Yaozong
|Decision (unanimous)
|UFC Fight Night: Blaydes vs. Ngannou 2 
|
|align=center|3
|align=center|5:00
|Beijing, China
|
|- 
|Loss
|align=center|8–4
|Chris de la Rocha
|TKO (punches)
|UFC 225
|
|align=center| 2
|align=center|3:53
|Chicago, Illinois, United States
|
|-
|Loss
|align=center|8–3 
|Tai Tuivasa
|KO (flying knee)
|UFC Fight Night: Werdum vs. Tybura 
|
|align=center|1
|align=center|4:35
|Sydney, Australia
|
|-  
|Loss
|align=center|8–2
|Chase Sherman
|KO (elbow)
|UFC 211
|
|align=center|2
|align=center|3:36
|Dallas, Texas, United States
|
|-
|Win
|align=center|8–1
|Larry Hopkins
|KO (punches)
|Legacy Fighting Alliance 1
|
|align=center|1
|align=center|0:38
|Dallas, Texas, United States
|
|-
| Win
| align=center| 7–1
|Jeremy Hardy
|KO (punch)
|Legacy Fighting Championship 61
|
|align=center|1
|align=center|1:11
|Dallas, Texas, United States
|
|-
| Win
| align=center| 6–1
| Allen Nelson
| KO (punches)
| Xtreme Knockout 30
| 
| align=center| 1
| align=center| 2:49
| Dallas, Texas, United States
|
|-
| Win
| align=center| 5–1 
| Jeremiah O'Neal
| TKO (knee and punches)
| Bellator 135
| 
| align=center| 1
| align=center| 1:44
| Thackerville, Oklahoma, United States
|
|-
| Win
| align=center| 4–1
| Alex Madrid
| TKO (punches)
| RFA 35: Moises vs. Castillo
| 
| align=center| 1
| align=center| 2:52
| Arlington, Texas, United States
|
|-
| Loss
| align=center| 3–1
| Derek Perkins
| Submission (kimura)
| Xtreme Knockout 18
| 
| align=center| 1
| align=center| 2:03
| Arlington, Texas, United States
|
|-
| Win
| align=center| 3–0
| Chase Watson
| TKO (punches)
| Shark Fights 21
| 
| align=center| 3
| align=center| 2:39
| Lubbock, Texas, United States
|
|-
| Win
| align=center| 2–0
| Alfredo Ayala
| TKO (punches)
| 24/7 Entertainment 2 
| 
| align=center| 1
| align=center| 2:19
| Midland, Texas, United States
|
|-
| Win
| align=center| 1–0
| Manuel Rodriguez	
| KO (punch)
| 24/7 Entertainment 2 
| 
| align=center| 2
| align=center| 1:56
| Amarillo, Texas, United States 
|
|-

Professional boxing record

See also
List of male mixed martial artists
List of current UFC fighters

References

External links
  
 

1981 births
Living people
American male mixed martial artists
African-American mixed martial artists
Mixed martial artists from North Carolina
Heavyweight mixed martial artists
Light heavyweight mixed martial artists
Mixed martial artists utilizing boxing
Mixed martial artists utilizing Muay Thai
Ultimate Fighting Championship male fighters
American male boxers
African-American boxers
Boxers from North Carolina
American Muay Thai practitioners
21st-century African-American sportspeople
20th-century African-American people